This article contains the complete discography of Thursday.

Discography

Studio albums

Compilation albums

Extended plays

Songs

Singles

Other appearances

References

Post-hardcore group discographies
Discographies of American artists